The Central District of Larestan County is a district (bakhsh) in Larestan County, Fars Province, Iran. At the 2006 census, its population was 87,988, in 20,633 families.  The district has three cities: Lar, Latifi, and Khur. The district has three rural districts (dehestan): Darz and Sayeban Rural District, Dehkuyeh Rural District, and Howmeh Rural District.

References 

Larestan County
Districts of Fars Province